André Boillot (8 August 1891 – 5 June 1932) was a French auto racing driver. Born in Valentigney, Doubs, he was the younger brother of race car driver, Georges Boillot. Following in his brother's footsteps, André Boillot began racing cars at a young age. However, World War I not only disrupted his career but claimed the life of his brother in 1916.

After the war, André Boillot returned to racing as part of the Peugeot factory team and drove their EXS model to victory in the 1919 Targa Florio. French drivers had been a major force since the inception of the Indianapolis 500 in the United States and he was part of a large post-war contingent of entrants from France. Boillot competed at the Indianapolis Motor Speedway in the 1919 "500" and was in the thick of things when he crashed with only five laps remaining. He returned to race in the event in 1920 and 1921 but both times went out early with mechanical problems. In Europe, he won the 1922 and 1925 editions of the Coppa Florio and in 1926 he and co-pilot Louis Rigal won the Spa 24 Hours in Belgium.

André Boillot was driving a Peugeot 201 when he crashed during practice for the 1932 Ars hillclimbing race at La Châtre. He died in hospital a few days later from his injuries.

Indy 500 results

French racing drivers
Indianapolis 500 drivers
Grand Prix drivers
24 Hours of Spa drivers
Peugeot people
1891 births
1932 deaths
Racing drivers who died while racing
Sport deaths in France